Cooperman is a surname. Notable people with the surname include:

Alan Cooperman, director of religion research at the Pew Research Center
Alvin Cooperman (1923–2006), television producer and an entertainment executive
Arthur J. Cooperman, New York State Supreme Court Justice
Bernard Dov Cooperman (born 1946), Louis L. Kaplan Associate Professor of Jewish History at the University of Maryland
Jim Cooperman, American Canadian author and conservationist
Kahane Cooperman (born 1965), American documentary filmmaker and television producer
Leon G. Cooperman, the billionaire chairman and CEO of Omega Advisors
Matthew Cooperman, American poet, critic and editor
Ralph Cooperman (1927–2009), British Olympic fencer
Stanley Cooperman (1929–1976), New York City-born poet
Tommy Cooperman of Breathe Carolina, an American electronic music duo from Denver, Colorado

See also
Cooper (disambiguation)
Copeman
Coppermine (disambiguation)
Kupperman